Je Tu Il Elle is a 1974 French-Belgian film by the Belgian film director Chantal Akerman. To celebrate the 30th anniversary of the Teddy Awards, the film was selected to be shown at the 66th Berlin International Film Festival in February 2016.

Plot
Julie lives alone in her room; she narrates the film, the first line of which is "So I left". For the first third of the film, she rearranges her furniture, writes letters, lounges in the nude, and eats sugar out of a paper bag. She eventually leaves her room and hitchhikes with a young male driver. They make stops at a restaurant, a bar, and a restroom. She gives him a handjob and he discusses his family life in a long monologue, before they part ways.

Julie then visits a woman, her ex-lover, who makes Julie sandwiches and a drink. Julie then suggestively begins to undress the woman, and they have sex. Julie's narration says the woman told her (Julie) "You have to leave in the morning." She does, bringing the film full circle.

Cast
 Chantal Akerman as Julie
 Niels Arestrup as the driver
 Claire Wauthion as the woman

Production
The sex scene between Julie and her ex-lover is the first graphic lesbian sex scene in mainstream cinema, and one the longest lesbian sex scenes in film.

Critical reception
The movie was well received by critics. On review aggregator Rotten Tomatoes, the film has a 100% rating based on reviews from 8 critics, and an average rating of 7.80/10.

References

External links 
 
 
 Je tu il elle at The Criterion Collection

1974 films
1974 drama films
1974 LGBT-related films
1970s feminist films
1970s French-language films
Belgian drama films
French drama films
French-language Belgian films
Belgian LGBT-related films
French LGBT-related films
Lesbian-related films
LGBT-related drama films
Films directed by Chantal Akerman
1970s French films